Alexander Benjamin Barnes is an American chemist. Educated at Whitman College and the Massachusetts Institute of Technology, he has taught at Washington University in St. Louis and ETH Zurich.

Career

Alexander Barnes earned his undergraduate degree in chemistry in 2003 from Whitman College in Walla Walla, Washington.  After earning his Ph.D. in chemistry in 2011 from the Massachusetts Institute of Technology under advisor Robert G. Griffin, he worked as a postdoctoral research associate at Stanford University.  He was an assistant chemistry professor of Chemistry at Washington University in St. Louis from 2012-2019, and is presently a Full Professor of Solid State NMR Spectroscopy at the Swiss Federal Institute of Technology ETH Zurich.

Barnes specializes in developing hardware for the interrogation of chemical structures using Magnetic Resonance Spectroscopy.  Some of his most notable innovations include the use of spherical sample containers instead of cylindrical ones, frequency-agile gyrotrons for use in dynamic nuclear polarization (DNP) NMR experiments,.

In 2018, Barnes received the Camille Dreyfus Teacher-Scholar Award.

At the 2019 Experimental Nuclear Magnetic Resonance Conference in Asilomar, California, California, Barnes received the Varian Young Investigator award.

References 

Massachusetts Institute of Technology School of Science alumni
Living people
21st-century American chemists
1981 births
Whitman College alumni
American expatriate academics
American expatriates in Switzerland
Washington University in St. Louis faculty
Scientists from St. Louis
Chemists from Missouri